Spiribacter curvatus  is a Gram-negative, strictly aerobic and non-motile bacterium from the genus of Spiribacter which has been isolated from brine from a saltern from Santa Pola in Spain.

References 

Chromatiales
Bacteria described in 2015
Halophiles